Ashes of Love is a 1918 American silent drama film directed by Ivan Abramson and starring James K. Hackett and Effie Shannon. It was distributed on the State's Rights system.

Cast
James K. Hackett as Arthur Woodridge
Effie Shannon as Louise Mordyke
Rubye De Remer as Ethel Woodridge
Mabel Julienne Scott as Helen Rosedale
Hugh Thompson as Howard Rosedale
Paula Shay 
Dora Mills Adams
William B. Davidson 
William Bechtel 
Thea Talbot

Preservation status
Preservation of this film is conflicting. Silent era has it existing in only one reel while the Library of Congress online resource has the whole film in its collection.

References

External links

1918 films
Films directed by Ivan Abramson
American silent feature films
American black-and-white films
Silent American drama films
1918 drama films
1910s American films